Anna Maria Chlumsky (born December 3, 1980) is an American actress. She began acting as a child, and first became known for playing Vada Sultenfuss in the film My Girl (1991) and its sequel, My Girl 2. Following her early roles, she went on hiatus from 1999 to 2005 to attend college.

Chlumsky returned to acting with roles in several independent films, including Blood Car (2007) and In the Loop (2009). She portrayed Amy Brookheimer on the HBO television series Veep (2012–2019), which earned her six nominations for the Primetime Emmy Award for Outstanding Supporting Actress in a Comedy Series, among other accolades.

Early life
Chlumsky was born in Chicago, Illinois, the daughter of Nancy (née Zuncic), a singer, actress, and former flight attendant, and Frank Chlumsky Jr., a chef and saxophone player. She was raised in a Catholic family. She is of Czech and Croatian descent.

Career

1989–1998: First roles
Chlumsky entered show business at an early age, modeling with her mother in an advertising campaign, though her roles in My Girl (1991) and My Girl 2 (1994) brought her fame. She also starred in Trading Mom (1994) with Sissy Spacek, and in Gold Diggers: The Secret of Bear Mountain (1995) with Christina Ricci. In the mid- to late 1990s, she appeared and starred in several television films and series.

1999–2005: University and hiatus from acting
Chlumsky took a break from acting to attend the University of Chicago, graduating with a Bachelor of Arts in International Studies in 2002. After college, she was hired as a fact-checker for the Zagat Survey and moved to New York City, which was followed by a position as an editorial assistant for a HarperCollins science fiction-fantasy imprint. However, she felt her career in the publishing industry was lackluster and unsatisfying, and ultimately returned to acting after she completed formal training at the Atlantic Acting School in Manhattan.

2006–present: Return to acting
Chlumsky appeared as Mary Calvin in a season 17 episode of Law & Order, first airing on January 12, 2007; and as Lisa Klein in a season 20 episode, first airing on March 15, 2010. In March 2007, she appeared in the 30 Rock episode "The Fighting Irish" as Liz Lemler, a romantic rival of protagonist Liz Lemon, who receives flowers meant for Lemler. Chlumsky was in four episodes of the ABC dramedy Cupid in 2009. Later that year, she starred in the Lifetime Television movie 12 Men of Christmas as Jan Lucas.

She starred in the Off Broadway production of Unconditional by Brett C. Leonard at The Public Theater, which opened in February 2008; it was produced by the LAByrinth Theater Company. She also starred in Lanford Wilson's Balm in Gilead in November 2005 at the American Theatre of Actors in New York City.

In 2009, she appeared in Armando Iannucci's BBC Films political satire In The Loop, co-starring with Peter Capaldi, Tom Hollander, Chris Addison, James Gandolfini, and Mimi Kennedy, a quasi-spinoff of Iannucci's BBC TV series The Thick of It. She plays Liza, a State Department assistant in the movie. From 2012 to 2019, Chlumsky played Amy Brookheimer, aide to Julia Louis-Dreyfus's character in HBO's Veep, also produced by Iannucci. In June 2012, she starred in the world premiere of David Adjmi's 3C at the Rattlestick Playwrights Theater in New York.

Dan Aykroyd, who played her father in the two My Girl films, has said that a script for a third film has been in development since 2003. In April 2012, Chlumsky "put to rest" any rumors that such a film was in development. In addition to her role on Veep, Chlumsky has appeared in multiple television series between 2011 and 2013, including White Collar, Law & Order: Special Victims Unit, and NBC's adaptation of Hannibal.

Chlumsky has appeared on Broadway in You Can't Take It with You, and beginning in April 2015 as editor Iris Peabody in the comedy Living on Love, with Renee Fleming, Jerry O'Connell and Douglas Sills.

In 2017, Chlumsky appeared in the fourth season of AMC Networks' Halt and Catch Fire as Dr. Katie Herman, the love interest of Gordon Clark (Scoot McNairy).

In October 2019, Chlumsky was cast in a main role alongside Julia Garner in Shonda Rhimes' Netflix limited drama series Inventing Anna. Chlumsky voices Charlotte Pickles in the 2021 Paramount+ revival of Rugrats.

Personal life
In October 2007, Chlumsky announced her engagement to Army Reserve member Shaun So, who also served a tour of duty in Afghanistan. They met as students at the University of Chicago in 2000. They married on March 8, 2008 in Brooklyn, New York, and have two daughters, born July 2013 and August 2016.

Filmography

Film

Television

Awards and nominations

References

External links 

 
 
 

1980 births
20th-century American actresses
21st-century American actresses
Actresses from Chicago
American child actresses
American film actresses
American people of Czech descent
American people of Croatian descent
American stage actresses
American television actresses
American voice actresses
Living people
University of Chicago alumni